Besni District is a district of Adıyaman Province of Turkey. Its seat is the town Besni. Its area is 1,235 km2, and its population is 77,207 (2021).

Composition
There are 6 municipalities in Besni District:
Besni
Çakırhüyük
Kesmetepe
Köseceli
Şambayat
Suvarlı

There are 67 villages in Besni District:

 Akdurak
 Akkuyu
 Akpınar
 Aktepe
 Akyazı
 Alıçlı
 Alişar
 Aşağıçöplü
 Atmalı
 Bahri
 Başlı
 Bereketli
 Berete
 Beşkoz
 Beşyol
 Boncuk
 Burunçayır
 Çamlıca
 Çamuşçu
 Çaykaya
 Çilboğaz
 Çomak
 Çorak
 Dikilitaş
 Doğankaya
 Dörtyol
 Eğerli
 Geçitli
 Gümüşlü
 Güneykaş
 Hacıhalil
 Harmanardı
 Hasanlı
 İzollu
 Karagüveç
 Karalar
 Kargalı
 Kesecik
 Kızılhisar
 Kızılin
 Kızılkaya
 Kızılpınar
 Konuklu
 Kurugöl
 Kutluca
 Kuzevleri
 Ören
 Oyratlı
 Pınarbaşı
 Sarıkaya
 Sarıyaprak
 Sayören
 Sugözü
 Taşlıyazı
 Tekağaç
 Tokar
 Toklu
 Topkapı
 Üçgöz
 Uzunkuyu
 Yayıklı
 Yazıbeydili
 Yazıkarakuyu
 Yelbastı
 Yeniköy
 Yoldüzü
 Yukarısöğütlü

References

Districts of Adıyaman Province